Veldman is a Dutch surname translating as "field man".  Notable people with the surname include:

Didy Veldman (born 1967), Dutch ballet dancer and choreographer
 (born 1951), Surinamese-Dutch jazz musician
Elfried Veldman (1966–1989), Dutch-Surinamese footballer
 (1921–2010), Dutch physical therapist
Hayke Veldman (born 1969), Dutch politician
Matt Veldman (born 1988), American football player
John Veldman (born 1968), Dutch football defender
Wybo Veldman (born 1946), New Zealand rower

See also
Veldman v DPP, Witwatersrand, a South African criminal law case
Veltman, Dutch surname of the same origin

References

Dutch-language surnames